ABS Aerolight was a French aircraft manufacturer based in Sérignan-du-Comtat. The company specialized in the design and manufacture of powered parachutes and roadable aircraft, in the form of kits for amateur construction and ready-to-fly aircraft for the European Fédération Aéronautique Internationale microlight category.

The company appears to have gone out of business in late 2007 and production ended.

The company produced a line of powered parachutes in the mid-2000s, including the semi-enclosed cockpit ABS Aerolight Legacy and two models of roadable aircraft, the ABS Aerolight ATE and the development ABS Aerolight Navigathor. The ATE and  Navigathor both feature a wedge-shaped boat hull, a parachute wing and off-road four-wheeled landing gear for land use and are powered by a ducted fan in all modes.

Aircraft

References

External links
Company website archives on Archive.org

Defunct aircraft manufacturers of France
Ultralight aircraft
Homebuilt aircraft
Roadable aircraft
Powered parachutes